Li Shaohong (born 7 July 1955) is a Chinese film and television director and producer. She is considered a member of the Fifth Generation movement, and China's top woman director. Her films have won multiple awards in China and abroad, including the Golden Montgolfiere at the 1992 Three Continents Festival (for Bloody Morning), and the Silver Bear at the 1995 Berlin International Film Festival (for Blush).

Early life
Li was born on 7 July 1955 in Suzhou, Jiangsu, but is considered a native of her ancestral hometown, Wendeng, Shandong, by Chinese convention. In 1969, when she was only 14, Li joined the army in the Sichuan military region, working in a military hospital. Reflecting on her military life, she said the army had too many rules and did not suit her personality, and she decided to pursue a film career.  After the end of the Cultural Revolution, she was admitted to Beijing Film Academy in 1978, graduating from its film directing department in 1982.

Career
In 1982, Li joined the Beijing Film Studio, where she worked as the assistant director for several films. In 1988, she directed her first film The Case of the Silver Snake.

Li's 1990 film Bloody Morning was a great success, winning multiple awards in China, Taiwan, France, and Germany, including the Golden Montgolfiere at the 1992 Three Continents Festival in Nantes. She became recognized as a member of the Fifth Generation movement of Chinese cinema, a loose collection of mainland Chinese filmmakers that first emerged in the early to mid-1980s, along with other directors like Zhang Yimou and Chen Kaige. Like other Fifth Generation films, Li Shaohong's works often focus on the rural side of Chinese society.

In 1994, she directed the film Blush (Hongfen), adapted from Su Tong's eponymous novel about two Shanghai prostitutes at the time of Liberation in 1949. The film won the Silver Bear for Outstanding Single Achievement at the 45th Berlin International Film Festival in 1995.

With the 2004 film Baober in Love, Li broke the mode of her previous works and ventured into the realm of magical realism.

Li is also a producer and has her own film production company. She has become a household name in China and is considered China's top woman director. She has also directed several TV dramas, including Palace of Desire (1998), which won the 18th Golden Eagle award for best TV drama, and The Dream of Red Mansions (2010).

Personal life
Li Shaohong is married to Zeng Nianping, a cameraman. They met at the Beijing Film Academy, where she was a student and he was an assistant professor. They have a daughter.

Filmography

References

External links
 
 
 Li Shaohong at the Chinese Movie Database

1955 births
Living people
Film directors from Jiangsu
Beijing Film Academy alumni
Artists from Suzhou
Chinese women film directors
Chinese film directors
Female military personnel